The Narsaq massacre was a mass shooting on 1 January 1990, during a party in Narsaq, a southern Greenland town in the municipality of Kujalleq,  south of the island's capital of Nuuk. Seven people were killed and one was critically wounded in the worst mass shooting in the autonomous constituent country's history.

Background
The self-governing Greenland has a relatively high murder rate compared to Denmark. A large proportion of Greenland's population are hunters and laws restricting ownership and storage of firearms are very light compared to Denmark's. In the Inuit society, punishment for crimes traditionally was lenient, as everybody were needed to survive in the harsh, isolated environment of Greenland. In the 20th century perpetrators of even relatively serious crimes often were allowed to serve their sentence in the open or semi-open prisons and institutions in Greenland. Those considered a significant risk to society were transferred to a closed prison in Denmark. (More recently, a closed prison was built in Greenland's capital.) Narsaq, with around 1,300 people of mostly Inuit ethnicity, is one of the largest towns in Greenland. The town contains one small hospital and a police station. Greenland had 18 homicides in 1989.

Shooting

During a New Years party after the turn of the year 1989 to 1990, student Abel Klemmensen got involved in a dispute with his best friend for taking the side of a girl he was angry at. Feeling betrayed, he then went home and later returned to the party with a semiautomatic rifle with the intention to kill all attendants of the party and commit suicide afterwards. The disgruntled perpetrator then opened fire in a boarding house complex in Ungbo, being used as a club, and aimed for people's heads.

In two rooms on the first floor he shot three women and four men, including his own brother, who was wounded by a shot through the cheek. While walking downstairs to the living room he shot a fourth woman. He had fired eleven rounds and hit all of his victims in the head.

Three men and two women died at the scene, while two more women died in the local hospital. All seven died from shots to the head, specifically the face, while another victim was critically wounded with another head or face injury from the weapon. After the tragedy, Klemmensen then went home to sleep, where he was later arrested by police and placed in custody.

Aftermath
The man in custody was identified as an 18-year-old student who confessed to the killings, said police inspector Lars Heilman. The suspect's name was later released as Abel Klemmensen (b. 1971). The crime scene was described as "gruesome" by the police. A team of police forensic scientists traveled to Narsaq from Copenhagen to investigate the killings, but were delayed by heavy snowfall. Those killed, all Inuit (like the perpetrator), were identified only as three men, aged 18, 33 and 34, and four women, aged 18, 19, 26 and 29. The wounded man was only identified as a "22-year-old man in stable condition with head wounds".

Klemmensen was later diagnosed as suffering from narcissistic personality disorder and was sentenced to indefinite detention at a psychiatric institution in March 1991. Considered too dangerous for the open and semi-open prisons in Greenland, he was moved to Herstedvester, a prison with facilities for psychiatric treatment in Denmark. Following an assessment, Klemmensen was allowed to serve at a semi-open facility in 2008. He first requested parole in 2011, but it was denied. In 2015, the High Court of Greenland granted him a five year parole and he was released.

See also
 List of rampage killers in the Americas

References

External links
 Evidence Locker True Crime Podcast

Massacres in Greenland
Massacres in 1990
1990 in Greenland
Spree shootings in Denmark
1990 in Denmark
1990 murders in Denmark
Deaths by firearm in Denmark
January 1990 events in North America
Attacks during the New Year celebrations